The men's 60 metres event at the 2015 European Athletics Indoor Championships was held on 7 March 2015 at 10:35 (heats), on 8 March at 14:55 (semifinals) and 17:15 (final) local time.

Medalists

Results

Heats
Qualification: First 4 of each heat (Q) and the next 4 fastest (q) qualified for the semifinals.

Semifinals
Qualification: First 2 of each heat (Q) and the next 2 fastest (q) qualified for the final.

Final

References

2015 European Athletics Indoor Championships
60 metres at the European Athletics Indoor Championships